Melica racemosa is a species of grass that is endemic to South Africa.

Description
The leaf sheaths are tubular and have closed at one end. The membraneis eciliate. The main panicle branches are indistinct and almost racemose.

The spikelets are cuneate, solitary, and have fertile spikelets that are pediceled. Both the upper and lower glumes are elliptic, keelless, membranous, and have an acute apex. Just like the lower glume, the fertile lemma is elliptic, keelless, and is 4–8 mm long. The sterile one though is glabrous.

The flowers are fleshy, oblong, truncate, have 2 lodicules and grow together. They have 3 anthers with fruits that are caryopsis. The fruit is also have additional pericarp with a linear hilum.

Ecology
Melica racemosa grows on hills and mountain slopes. The flowers bloom from September to April.

References

racemosa
Endemic flora of South Africa
Flora of Africa
Taxa named by Gotthilf Heinrich Ernst Muhlenberg